GKS Katowice is a professional ice hockey team in Katowice, Poland.

The team was founded in 1964. GKS Katowice won six Polska Liga Hokejowa titles between 1958 and 1970. From 2017 to 2019 the name of the club was changed to Tauron KH GKS Katowice, due to sponsorship by Tauron Group. The club finished the regular season 2021-2022 in 1st place and won the playoffs by defeating Zagłębie Sosnowiec, GKS Tychy and Unia Oświęcim.

Notable members

The original coaches for GKS Katowice were Aggie Kukulowicz, and Stanislav Konopásek.

Achievements
Polish championship:
 1st place (7): 1958, 1960, 1962, 1965, 1968, 1970, 2022
 2nd place (10): 1956, 1957, 1959, 1961, 1967, 1969, 2001, 2002, 2003, 2018
 3rd place (10): 1955, 1963, 1966, 1975, 1994, 1995, 1997, 1998, 2019, 2020

IIHF Continental Cup:
 3rd place (1): 2019

Polish cup:
 Winner (1): 1970
 Finalist (1): 2001

2nd ligue:
 1st place (1): 2012

Autosan cup:
 1st place (3): 1973, 1975, 1976

Champions Hockey League
GKS Katowice will make its Champions Hockey League debut in the 2022-23 season. The team will face Rögle BK, ZSC Lions and Fehérvár AV19.

Players in the season 2021/2022

References

External links
 Official site 

Ice hockey teams in Poland
Sport in Katowice